Milcom or Milkom (Ammonite: 𐤌𐤋𐤊𐤌 *Mīlkām;) was the name of either the national god, or a popular god, of the Ammonites. He is attested in the Hebrew Bible and in archaeological finds from the former territory of Ammon. His connections to other deities with similar names attested in the Bible and archaeologically are debated, as well as his relationship to the Canaanite supreme deity El, or the putative deity Moloch.

Attestations
Milcom is attested several times in the Hebrew Bible, although these attestations say little about him. In the Masoretic Text, the name Milcom occurs three times, in each case in a list of foreign deities whose worship is offensive to Yahweh, the god of the Israelites. The name occurs several additional times in the Septuagint: 2 Samuel 12:30, 1 Chronicles 20:2, Amos 1:15, Jeremiah 40 (=30):1.3, Zephaniah 1:5, and 1 Kings 11:7. The Masoretic text reads , meaning "their king" in most of these instances. It is likely that the Hebrew text originally read Milcom in at least some of these instances.

The Bible attests Milcom as playing the role of the Ammonites' chief state god in parallel to Yahweh's role in Israel. Given that the Bible refers to Milcom having been worshiped by royal sanction in Jerusalem, it is possible that he was also worshiped as a native rather than a foreign god in Israel.

Outside the bible, the name Milcom is attested in archaeology, such as on several Ammonite seals, where he is often connected with bull imagery. These seals indicate that Milcom was seen as benevolent, exalted, strong, and has associations with the stars. The Amman Citadel Inscription (c. 9th or 8th century BCE), as it has been reconstructed, contains an oracle from Milcom, while the name is also mentioned on the Tell el-Mazar ostracon. Two Ammonite names are attested containing the name Milcom as an element. However, in Ammonite theophoric names, El, the chief god of the Canaanite pantheon, appears more frequently than Milcom. On this basis, Walter Aufrecht proposes that Milcom was not the state god of the Ammonites and that he may instead have been a patron god of the Ammonite royal house.

Stone statues discovered around Ammon may depict Milcom. Several of these figures show features of the Ancient Egyptian god Osiris, namely the atef crown, suggesting that aspects of Osiris may have been adopted into Milcom's cult. An image of a four-winged scarab beetle has also been suggested to portray Milcom, however, this is inconclusive.

Relationship to other Near-Eastern deities
The name seems to derive from the root , meaning 'to rule'. On the basis of the similar iconography and the greater attestations of names containing the name El than Milcom, it has been suggested that Milcom may have been an epithet of El used in Ammon, or that Milcom was another god who gradually become associated with El in the same manner as Yahweh became associated with El in Israel. Scholar Collin Cornell has criticized attempts to argue that Milcom was the same deity as El or became syncretized with him as lacking evidence; he argues that similarities between El and Milcom in fact only show that El and Milcom "were I[ron ]A[ge] Levantine gods characteristic of their region and era."

Gods with similar names are also attested. A god called mlkm is mentioned on a list of gods from Ugarit, one called Malkum is also attested on tablets from Drehem, and a god called Malik is attested from Nineveh, as well as theophoric names in the Mari tablets and Ebla tablets. The name is also similar to the potential god Moloch found in the Bible, and Moloch is once called the god of the Ammonites in the Masoretic text (1 Kings 11:6-7). The relations between these deities is uncertain; the description of Moloch as a god of the Ammonites may be a scribal error. As further evidence against identifying Milcom with Moloch, E. Puech notes that both are portrayed as having separate places of worship in Jerusalem in the Bible.

References

Sources

Ammon
Deities in the Hebrew Bible
Phoenician mythology
West Semitic gods
Osiris
El (deity)
National gods